"The NATO Hymn" is the organizational anthem of the North Atlantic Treaty Organization (NATO). It is an instrumental piece, composed in 1989 by André Reichling, a Luxembourgish military officer and a member of its military band. It was used unofficially for many years before being formally adopted in January 2018.

History
Initial proposals for adopting an organizational anthem for NATO date back to 1958, its tenth anniversary. A "NATO Song" was publicly performed, but not adopted. In 1960, British Royal Air Force marshal Edward Chilton proposed combining members states' national anthems into a single composition as the organizational anthem.

In 1989, to commemorate NATO's 40th anniversary, Luxembourgish military band officer André Reichling composed an instrumental musical piece titled "The NATO Hymn" and it was performed at an anniversary gala that year. Used as an unofficial anthem at many NATO events in subsequent years, it was formally adopted on 3 January 2018.

References

External links

1989 songs
Anthems of organizations
Anthem
Songs about the military